Fonjallaz is a traditional winery in Epesses, Switzerland, the family business founded in 1552.

The basic facts:

The region was used for the wine production from 12th century, when Bishop of Lausanne gave uncultivated soil to Cistercian monks.
In 1552 the Fonjallaz family started the viticulture tradition.
Today the winery is managed by Patrick Fonjallaz in the 12th family generation.
The vineyard area is about 34 hectares and the slope is 30-50 percent.

See also 
List of oldest companies

References

External links 
Homepage
Location on Google Maps

Wineries of Switzerland
16th-century establishments in Switzerland
Food and drink companies established in the 16th century
Companies based in the canton of Vaud